Mildred Olive Bangs Wynkoop (born September 9, 1905 in Seattle, Washington, died May 21, 1997 in Lenexa, Kansas) was an ordained minister in the Church of the Nazarene, who served as an educator, missionary, theologian, and the author of several books. Donald Dayton indicates that "Probably most influential for a new generation of Holiness scholars has been the work of Nazarene theologian Mildred Bangs Wynkoop, especially her book A Theology of Love: The Dynamic of Wesleyanism." The Wynkoop Center for Women in Ministry located in Kansas City, Missouri is named in her honour. The Timothy L. Smith and Mildred Bangs Wynkoop Book Award of the Wesleyan Theological Society also jointly honours her "outstanding scholarly contributions."

Personal life
Mildred Olive Bangs was born on 9 September 1905 in Seattle, Washington, the daughter of Carl Oliver Bangs (born in Mandal, Norway) and Mery Dupertuis (born in Ollon, Canton de Vaud, Switzerland), both immigrants to the United States. She is the older sister of theologian Carl Bangs (born 5 April 1922 in Seattle, Washington; died 7 July 2002), the author of Arminius: A Study in the Dutch Reformation (New York and Nashville: Abingdon Press, 1971; rev, ed. 1985); and also of Bernice Bangs Morgan, a former evangelist and Methodist home missions pastor in Alaska, who was at one time "the only woman minister in Alaska", and author of The Very Thought of Thee: Adventures of an Arctic Missionary (1952). She had three other sisters.

Wynkoop's parents met Phineas Bresee, General Superintendent of the Church of the Nazarene on their honeymoon and became charter members of Seattle First Church of the Nazarene. Mildred Bangs entered Northwest Nazarene College and travelled in its collegiate quartet with president H. Orton Wiley on the weekends. Two years later, she followed Wiley to Pasadena College, (now Point Loma Nazarene University) to complete her bachelor's degrees.

While studying at Pasadena College, Mildred met her future husband, fellow student Ralph Carl Wynkoop (born 5 October 1905 in Omaha, Nebraska; died 3 March 2001 at Kansas City, Missouri). On 27 December 1928 Mildred and Ralph were married at the Central Church of the Nazarene (now the Aurora Church of the Nazarene) in Seattle, Washington. Several ministers officiated at the wedding, including Rev. Alpin Bowes, pastor of the church, and Rev. Elsie Wallace, the first woman ordained by Phineas Bresee in the Church of the Nazarene. Their first home was Pasadena, California, where they were students at Pasadena College.

Education
Wynkoop initially studied at Northwest Nazarene College (now Northwest Nazarene University) in Nampa, Idaho, where she was a student of Nazarene theologian H. Orton Wiley and biblical scholar Olive Winchester. After Wiley resigned to become president of Pasadena College (now Point Loma Nazarene University), she transferred also to Pasadena College, where she received her A.B. and Th.B. degrees in 1931. She earned a Bachelor of Divinity (B.D.) degree from Western Evangelical Seminary (now George Fox Evangelical Seminary) in 1952. Her thesis was entitled "A Biblical Study of Man in His Relationship to the Image of God."  Additionally, she earned a M.Sc. from the University of Oregon in 1953; and a Doctorate in Theology (Th.D.) from Northern Baptist Theological Seminary in 1955. Her thesis was entitled "A Historical and Semantic Analysis of Methods of Biblical Interpretation as They Relate to Views of Inspiration."

Ministry
Influenced by early role models like Rev. Mrs. Elsie Wallace, a pastor of Seattle First Church of the Nazarene and briefly superintendent of the Northwest District of the Church of the Nazarene, and by Olive Winchester, theologian and academic dean at Northwest Nazarene College, Wynkoop walked through the doors of ministry that opened to her.

Pastoral Ministry and Evangelism
For about 20 years, until they decided that Mildred would begin graduate studies, the Wynkoops served together as co-pastors or full-time itinerant evangelists. They were co-pastors of the Glassell Park Church of the Nazarene in Los Angeles for four years until her graduation from Pasadena College in 1931, before pastoring the Church of the Nazarene at Ojai, California for a year. Their next pastorate was for four years at Marshfield, Oregon (now Coos Bay). During this pastorate, Mildred was ordained in 1934 as an elder in the Church of the Nazarene by John W. Goodwin, General Superintendent in the Church of the Nazarene, and Ralph was ordained in 1935 by General Superintendent Roy T. Williams.

Ralph and Mildred spent the next five years travelling as evangelists, mostly on the West Coast.  They moved to Portland, Oregon, to serve the Brentwood Church of the Nazarene for nine years. When Mildred enrolled in doctoral studies in Chicago, Illinois, Ralph returned to evangelistic ministry.

Educational Ministry
Wynkoop's first teaching assignment was at Western Evangelical Seminary (now George Fox Evangelical Seminary) in Portland, Oregon, where she served as Professor of Theology from 1956 to December 1960. From 1961 to 1966 she taught in Japan where she was the founding President of Japan Nazarene Theological Seminary, and briefly in Taiwan. From 1966 to 1976 she served as Professor of Theology and Director of the Department of Missions at Trevecca Nazarene College (now Trevecca Nazarene University) in Nashville, Tennessee. From 1976 to 1979 Wynkoop was the Theologian-in-Residence at Nazarene Theological Seminary in Kansas City, Missouri.

Theology
Wynkoop's theology has been described as "relational theology" by Michael Lodahl. Wynkoop's theological agenda was shaped initially by H. Orton Wiley, "America's leading exponent of Arminian theology". 
 Wiley understood that the Nazarenes were oriented to the Protestant Reformation through the Anglican tradition. Stimulated by Wiley, Wynkoop's brother, Carl Bangs, became a world authority on the Dutch reformer James Arminius and Arminianism's spread in England and America. Her interests, however, focused on John Wesley and his relevance for theological life today.

In John Wesley: Christian Revolutionary (1970) Wynkoop showed how the Wesleyan tradition's founder held together two strains torn apart by American fundamentalism: personal piety and social compassion. She urged a return to Wesley's classic formulation. She provided an account of her church's basic theology in Foundations of Wesleyan-Arminian Theology(1967).

Six years of missionary service in Taiwan and Japan stimulated Wynkoop's creative thinking on how to best communicate the theology of holiness—a process that resulted in her 1973 magnum opus A Theology of Love, a reinterpretation of the Wesleyan message for her time. Wynkoop was also influenced by the process theology of Daniel Day Williams. In A Theology of Love, she questioned the terminology of a "second work of grace." She taught sin was not a substance to be eradicated, but a wrong relationship with God. Wynkoop taught the decisive moment of salvation was justification and that believers received the Holy Spirit at that time. She did not connect the baptism of the Spirit with entire sanctification. Wynkoop advocated: 
Ontological trichotomy, a recent revival of Gnostic thought in some Christian circles, undermines a concept of the unity of personality so basically assumed in Hebrew thought. It raises no barriers to-in fact it actually suggests and encourages-a virtual depersonalizing of the self. If man is only the sum of so many entities, he is simply an aggregate of selves, a split personality, a double mind; not a responsible, valid, centralized self. Any pluralistic concept of personality destroys the foundation of biblical holiness which is characterized by love, and which is a wholly personal quality capable of being experienced, truly, only by a unified person.
It has always been the most profound conviction of Wesleyanism that the Bible speaks to the moral relationships of men and not about sub-rational, non-personal areas of the self. Sin is basically self-separation from God, not in measurable distance but in moral unlikeness and spiritual alienation. Holiness is moral to the core -love to God and man-qualities of the self in relation to the person of God and of men.

Love is the gospel message. Christian love, revealed by God in Christ, is the correction of man's limited, selfish, selective, perverted love. It stands against any human concept of love projected into a theory of God's nature and His way with man. It is precisely this unlimited, impartial, indestructible love that needed to be "revealed" because the best in human love has been limited. The very nature of sin is love's perversion which makes the self the object of its own dedication. Could the dogma of particular election as understood by some theological traditions be the projection of faulty human love into the very nature of God? The gospel was not born in human philosophy but in God's heart revealed in Christ. This Wesley declared.

 Holiness and love are two different words for two different things. In the realm of formal definition each is distinct. They cannot be interchangeably used in any one context. But this is in the realm of words as words. In the realm of existential meaning something of their relatedness begins to come through. But it would be inaccurate to say they are "related." To say holiness and love are not identical but related would imply that they were associated in experience but not vitally and essentially connected in life. It would say that each has an autonomy apart from the other. Somewhat in the sense that a house and a home, a person and a lawyer, an institution and a school can be equated, holiness and love can also be ... When holiness and love are put together, the analogy of the two sides of a coin would be closer to the truth. Neither side can be both sides at the same time. Sides are not to be equated, but the obverse side is as essential to its existence as the face. Love is the essential inner character of holiness, and holiness does not exist apart from love. That is how close they are, and in a certain sense they can be said to be the same thing. At least Wesley consistently defined holiness, as well as perfection, as love.

Wynkoop wrote "an admirable college history in The Trevecca Story, beginning with an analysis of the school's theological roots."

Honours and awards
Wynkoop served as the President of the Wesleyan Theological Society in 1973. She received Trevecca Nazarene College's Faculty Member of the Year award and its President's Award for Distinguished Service in 1970; Certificate of Merit from Trevecca Nazarene College in 1976; Alumnus of the Year from Western Evangelical Seminary in 1980; Holiness Exponent of the Year award from the Christian Holiness Association in 1990; and Alumnus of the Year from Point Loma Nazarene College in 1992.

Publications

Books

Theses

Articles 
Wynkoop published articles in The Wesleyan Theological Journal, The Asbury Seminarian, Sanctification and Biblical Theology, Theological Trends, Preachers' Magazine, Herald of Holiness, Light and Life, and The Seminary Tower. Among her published articles are:

Archives
Dr. Mildred Bangs Wynkoop Collection. 1920-1995. Published and unpublished writings, correspondence, extensive photographs, recorded lectures, recorded sermons, syllabi, classroom materials, oral history. Noted Nazarene theologian and seminary president. 

Location: Church of the Nazarene Archives, International Headquarters, Kansas City, Missouri.

Notes and references

Citations

Sources

Further reading 
Dimond, Gregory S. "The Theological Contributions of Mildred Bangs Wynkoop." The Tower (Journal of Nazarene Theological Seminary) 2 (1998): 6.
Greathouse, William M. "Mildred Bangs Wynkoop:  Holiness Pioneer". The Tower (Journal of Nazarene Theological Seminary) 2 (1998)
Ingersol, Stan. "Nazarene Women and Religion Sources on Clergy and Lay Women in the Church with antecedent and related materials." Nazarene Archives and Clergy Services of the Church of the Nazarene, March 2003. 
Ingersol, Stan. "Your Daughters Shall Prophesy: Nazarene Women and an Apostolic Ministry".
Langford, Thomas A. Practical Divinity: Theology in the Wesleyan Tradition. Nashville, Abingdon Press, 1983. Analyzes theology of Mildred Bangs Wynkoop.
Lodahl, Michael. "The New Wine of Wynkoop's Relational Reading of Wesley: Refreshing? -- or Bursting the Old Skins?" Lecture at Southern Nazarene University, 22 February 2005.
Lodahl, Michael. "www.theology.com Wynkoop's Debt to Wiley and Williams". Lecture at Southern Nazarene University, 23 February 2005.
Lodahl, Michael. "Wynkoop's Whiteheadian Wesley". Lecture at Southern Nazarene University, 24 February 2005.
Mann, Mark H. Perfecting Grace: Holiness, Human Being, and the Sciences. T & T Clark, 2006. See pages 31–37 for Wynkoop's Neo-Wesleyan Critique of Holiness Theology (as exemplified by the Eradicationist Theology of Daniel Steele.)
O'Brien, Glen A. "A Trinitarian Revisioning of the Wesleyan Doctrine of Christine Perfection'. Aldersgate Papers 2 (September 2001). Detailed chapter by chapter summary of Wynkoop's A Theology of Love.

External links
Works of Wynkoop 

George Fox University alumni
Northern Baptist Theological Seminary alumni
University of Oregon alumni
Nazarene theologians
American theologians
Arminian ministers
Arminian theologians
1905 births
1997 deaths
American Nazarene ministers
Educators from Seattle
American women educators
Northwest Nazarene University alumni
Point Loma Nazarene University alumni
Trevecca Nazarene University faculty
American people of Norwegian descent